

Notes

References

See also 
Mohs scale of mineral hardness
Mohs hardness of materials (data page)
Vickers hardness test
Brinell scale

Properties of chemical elements
Chemical element data pages